Robert Fountain may refer to:
 Robert Fountain (mental calculator), mental calculator and author
 Robert Fountain (event designer), event designer and planner